The Lancashire County Football Association Cup (commonly known as the Lancashire Senior Cup) is a football knockout tournament involving teams from Lancashire, England. It is a County Cup competition of the Lancashire County Football Association and involves Premier League clubs and Football League clubs. However, these days the bigger Football League clubs generally field their reserve teams.

Historic Lancashire currently has 5 Premier League teams, 12 Football League sides and 4 National League teams — this means not every club enters in concurrent years — the tournament starts at the round of 16 so higher up clubs often have to miss years to allow lower down clubs a chance to play in the competition.

List of winners

Recent finals
Results of Finals from 1879 to 1920 and since the competition was revived for the 2004–05 season.

Table of winners

See also
Lancashire Challenge Trophy
Liverpool Senior Cup
Manchester Senior Cup

References

External links
 The Official Website of the Lancashire Football Association

Football in Lancashire
County Cup competitions
Recurring sporting events established in 1879